Kolan is a settlement and municipality in Zadar County, Croatia. According to 2011 census information, there are 791 inhabitants in Kolan.

It was established in 2003 by separation from the town of Pag.

References

External links
Tourist board Kolan

Municipalities of Croatia
Populated places in Zadar County
Pag (island)